Alexander Matveevich Nikonov (Russian: Александр Матвеевич Никонов; 31 August 1893 – 26 October 1937) was a Soviet komdiv (division commander). He fought in the Imperial Russian Army during World War I before going over to the Bolsheviks in February 1917 and serving in the Red Army durimg the subsequent Civil War.

Novikov was an acting head of the Main Intelligence Directorate of the Red Army in 1937.

He was executed during the Great Purge.

Bibliography
 
 

1893 births
1937 deaths
Russian military personnel of World War I
Soviet military personnel of the Russian Civil War
Soviet komdivs
Great Purge victims from Russia
People executed by the Soviet Union